Theodicius was the Duke of Spoleto from 763 to 773. Though it is often stated that he died at the Siege of Pavia (774), he was still alive on 9 June 776, when Charlemagne confirmed the properties of the monastery of Farfa and Abbot Ingoald in the reign of his successor Hildeprand.

References

Sources
Hodgkin, Thomas. Italy and her Invaders. Clarendon Press: 1895.
Costambeys, Marios. Power and Patronage in the Early Medieval Italy: Local Society, Italian Politics, and the Abbey of Farfa, c.700–900. Cambridge University Press: 2007.

External links
Medieval Lands Project: Northern Italy — Spoleto.

8th-century dukes of Spoleto
8th-century births
8th-century deaths

Year of birth unknown
Year of death unknown